Serafín Zayas (born 30 January 1996) is an Argentine badminton player. He was the gold medalists at the 2013 South American Youth Games in the mixed doubles event partnered with Lohaynny Vicente of Brazil. Zayas competed at the 2018 South American Games.

Achievements

BWF International Challenge/Series 
Men's singles

  BWF International Challenge tournament
  BWF International Series tournament
  BWF Future Series tournament

References

External links 
 

Living people
1996 births
People from Neuquén
Argentine male badminton players
Competitors at the 2018 South American Games
20th-century Argentine people
21st-century Argentine people